Nik Muhammad Farith Adruce bin Nik Adelin, professionally known as Nik Adruce (born 30 September 1994 in Bangsar, Kuala Lumpur, Malaysia) is a Malaysian TV host and actor.

Personal life
Adruce is the only son of Nik Adelin Nik Ismail and the late Leza Maheran Abdul Ali. Adruce attended school at Sekolah Kebangsaan SS19 Subang Jaya, Selangor and scored 5As in the Primary School Assessment Test (UPSR). He was the cousin of Shafimie Saedon and is friends with Addy Ashraf. His artistic talent began to show in a story-telling competition organised by the British Council in 2003 which was held at the Petronas Twin Towers, Kuala Lumpur. This was later followed by a role in a school play, Tiga Abdul ("Three" Abduls). He is known as the presenter on Adik di 9 on TV9, as Bulat in Tentang Bulan and as Johan on Disney's Waktu Rehat. In 2010, Nik Adruce drastically lost weight and it sparked wild gossip about him undergoing liposuction. He's currently doing his studies in accountancy in Universiti Tenaga Nasional, Bandar Muadzam Shah.

On 5 October 2019, Nik tied the knot with Syafiqah Sofian, a former litigation criminal lawyer who recently transitioned her legal career into the corporate world. The couple welcomed their first child, Nik Eleanor Binti Nik Muhammad Farith Adruce after 1 year 6 month of marriage.

Filmography

Film
Tipah Tertipu (The Trapped Tipah)
Remp-It (The Street Racers)
Tentang Bulan (About the Moon)
Brainscan: Aku dan Topi Ajaib (Brainscan: Me and the Magical Hat)

Drama
Pasca Merdeka (Post Independence)
Anak-Anak Ramadhan (The Children of Ramadhan)
Waktu Rehat (Break Time)
Tan & Tun (Tan and Tun)
Misi Yaya (Yaya's Mission)

TV Shows
Adik di 9 (Kids at 9)
Cooking with Chef
Apa Cerita? (What's d' Story?)

References

External links
 Nik Adruce on Instagram

Living people
1994 births
People from Kuala Lumpur
Malaysian male actors
Malaysian people of Malay descent
Malaysian Muslims
Malaysian child actors